Echoes and Rhymes is a 2012 studio album by The Primitives. It is their first album since their 2009 reunion. The album collects cover versions of 1960s "obsurities."

Track listing

References

The Primitives albums